The skin-toe forest gecko (Cyrtodactylus interdigitalis)  is a species of gecko found in Phetchabun and Loei provinces of Thailand as well in Laos.

References

Cyrtodactylus
Reptiles of Laos
Geckos of Thailand
Reptiles described in 1993